Vincenzo is a 2021 South Korean television series starring Song Joong-ki as the title character alongside Jeon Yeo-been, Ok Taec-yeon, Kim Yeo-jin, and Kwak Dong-yeon. It aired on tvN from February 20, 2021, to May 2, 2021, every Saturday and Sunday at 21:00 (KST); each episode was released on Netflix in South Korea and internationally after its television broadcast.

The first episode reached a 7.7% rating (AGB nationwide), making it the fourth highest-rated tvN drama premiere. The finale received 14.6% rating, making it the eleventh highest-rated drama in Korean cable television history at the time. It also made the series the sixth highest-rated drama in tvN's history.

The series was also popular among international viewers through Netflix, maintaining its position in the top 10 TV shows on Netflix in the world since its start and reached the fourth rank on April 26. It ranked fourth on Forbes list of most-viewed Korean series on Netflix in 2021.

Synopsis

At the age of eight, Park Joo-hyung (Song Joong-ki) was adopted by an Italian family. He later joins the mafia and is adopted by Don Fabio, head of the Cassano Family. Renamed “Vincenzo Cassano” he becomes a lawyer, a consigliere for the mafia, and Don Fabio's right-hand man. After Fabio dies, Paolo, Fabio's biological son and the new leader of the Cassano Family attempts to kill Vincenzo.

He flees to Seoul and sets out to recover 1.5 tons of gold that he helped a recently-dead Chinese tycoon secretly stash within the basement of Geumga Plaza. However, a subsidiary of Babel Group has illegally taken ownership of the building, and Vincenzo must use his skills to reclaim the building and recover his fortunes.

Among the quirky tenants at Geumga Plaza is the Jipuragi Law Firm run by Hong Yoo-chan (Yoo Jae-myung) in which Vincenzo finds he has aligned interests. At first he comes into conflict with Hong Yoo-chan's daughter, Hong Cha-young (Jeon Yeo-been), an attorney for a rival firm, but after her father's death she takes over the practice and joins forces with Vincenzo and the other tenants to fight Babel Group.

Cast and characters

Main
 Song Joong-ki as Vincenzo Cassano / Park Joo-hyung
An Italian lawyer and Mafia consigliere of Korean descent. He is the adopted son of the late boss of the Cassano Family and Geumga Plaza's true owner. He becomes an Advisor/Foreign Legal Counsel to Jipuragi Law Firm, working with Hong Cha-young to destroy the Babel Group and reclaim the gold hidden in Geumga Plaza.
 Jeon Yeo-been as Hong Cha-young
A lawyer, who is an associate for the Wusang Law Firm and the daughter of Hong Yoo-chan. Energetic, she tends to overreact. She later replaces her father as CEO of Jipuragi Law Firm. She joins Vincenzo in his vendetta against Babel Group.
 Ok Taec-yeon as Jang Jun-woo / Jang Han-seok
 Moon Seong-hyun as young Jang Han-seok
An intern in Wusang Law Firm working under Hong Cha-young as her paralegal/assistant, and the real Chairman of Babel Group. He puts on a front as a happy-go-lucky, dumb, and naive man. However, he is revealed as the true power behind the Babel Group. He is the main antagonist of the series.
 Kim Yeo-jin as Choi Myung-hee
A former prosecutor who quits the prosecutor's office to join Wusang Law Firm as its new Senior Partner, and in the process becomes the corporate fixer and attorney of Babel Group. She appears good-natured and enjoys Zumba dancing but is, in reality, extremely corrupt and is Jang Jun-woo's accomplice in his schemes.
 Kwak Dong-yeon as Jang Han-seo
The half-brother of Jang Jun-woo and the previous chairman's illegitimate son who publicly acts as the owner of Babel Group in his brother's place. He appears rude, cocky and pretentious, but he is more morally equipped than his brother.

Supporting

Wusang Law Firm
 Jo Han-chul as Han Seung-hyuk
The CEO of Wusang Law Firm. He recruits Choi Myung-hee into Wusang. He eventually becomes the Chief of the Seoul Southeast District Prosecutors' Office.

Geumga Plaza
 Yoon Byung-hee as Nam Joo-sung
A paralegal working at Jipuragi Law Firm under lawyer Hong Yoo-chan and later Hong Cha-young. He is a former special effect make-up artist. After the death of Hong Yoo-chan, he joins Vincenzo and Hong Cha-young in destroying Babel Group.
 Choi Young-joon as Cho Young-woon
Manager of Geumga Plaza. His name is used in Geumga Plaza's deed. Vincenzo once saved his life back in Milan, and is thus indebted to Vincenzo. It is later revealed that he is an undercover agent of the International Security Intelligence Service, but he remains as an ally to Vincenzo.
 Choi Deok-moon as Tak Hong-shik
Owner of the laundromat. He purposely ruins Vincenzo's limited edition bespoke suit because he thought that Vincenzo wants to evict him and the other tenants. He was a former gang member and uses scissors as his weapon.
 Kim Hyung-mook as Toto
Owner of the Italian restaurant in Geumga Plaza. He pretends to have studied in Italy to be a chef and feels threatened by Vincenzo who easily learns his secret.
 Lee Hang-na as Kwak Hee-soo
Owner of a snack bar in Geumga Plaza. She regularly beats her teenage son who secretly smokes. She was a former boxer.
 Kim Seol-jin as Larry Kang
Owner of a dance studio in Geumga Plaza. He is a clean-freak and hates it when people makes his studio dirty.
 Kim Yoon-hye as Seo Mi-ri
Owner of the piano school in Geumga Plaza. She has a crush on Vincenzo. It is later revealed that she was a hacker and designed the security of the gold vault. She narrowly escaped assassination and moved to Geumga Plaza to keep an eye on the gold. 
 Yang Kyung-won as Lee Chul-wook
A self-proclaimed expert martial artist and owner of a pawnshop in Geumga Plaza. He often talks big about beating up opponents but he chickens out.
 Seo Ye-hwa as Jang Yeon-jin
Lee Chul-wook's wife. She berates her husband when he shows false bravado.
 Kang Chae-min as Kim Young-ho
Kwak Hee-soo's son. He often smokes with his friends against his mother's wishes. 
 Ri Woo-jin as Jeokha
The abbot of Nanyak Pagoda in Geumga Plaza. He felt a strong presence of Buddha under the place he usually sits because of a golden statue of Buddha stashed under there. Sometimes he gives Vincenzo advice on how to deal with his problems and insecurities.
 Kwon Seung-woo as Chaeshin
A monk assisting Jeokha. He is close to the other tenants and act as an advisor.

Ant Financial Management
 Kim Young-woong as Park Seok-do
CEO of Ant Financial Management. He is a gangster who worked for Babel Group. He was in charge of Geumga Plaza's demolition, but moves into the plaza after nearly being killed by Babel and starts a business called ByeBye Balloon. He eventually helps Jipuragi in their fight against Babel.
 Lee Dal as Jeon Soo-nam
Employee of Ant Financial Management. He is a gangster and Park Seok-do's second-in-command. He joins his boss in helping Jipuragi fight Babel Group.
 Jung Ji-yoon as Yang Joo-eun
The accountant of Ant Financial Management and later ByeBye Balloon. She has a crush on Vincenzo. She helps Jipuragi fight Babel Group.

International Security Intelligence Service
 Im Chul-soo as Ahn Gi-seok
Team leader of the Italian Organized Crime Division of the International Security Intelligence Service. He goes undercover to spy on Vincenzo by becoming a protégé under Chef Toto.
 Kwon Tae-won as Tae Jong-gu
Director of the International Organized Crime Bureau, under the International Security Intelligence Service. He initially disapproves of Ahn Gi-seok's plan to launch an operation to spy on Vincenzo, but eventually helps Gi-seok and Jipuragi.

Seoul Southeast District Prosecutors' Office
 Seo Jin-won as Hwang Jin-tae
Chief of the Seoul Southeast District Prosecutors' Office. Choi Myung-hee's former boss. He is on Babel Group's payroll after being blackmailed.
 Hwang Tae-kwang as Seo Woong-ho
Deputy Chief of Seoul Southeast District Prosecutors' Office. He is murdered by Jang Han-seok.
 Go Sang-ho as Jung In-kook
A prosecutor from Seoul Southeast District Prosecutors' Office. He works with Cho Young-woon to obtain the Guillotine File and helps Vincenzo fight Babel. He later betrays Vincenzo and works for Jang Han-seok. He is killed by Vincenzo for his betrayal.

Cassano family
 Salvatore Alfano as Paolo Cassano
Vincenzo Cassano's adoptive brother and new leader of the Cassano Family. He tries to have Vincenzo killed out of resentment, but fails, causing Vincenzo to flee to South Korea. He later helps both Choi Myung-hee and Han Seung-hyuk in killing and framing Vincenzo, but fails. 
 Luca Vaquer as Luca
Vincenzo Cassano's personal driver and assistant. He works for the Cassano Family and is more loyal to Vincenzo than Paolo. He updates Vincenzo about the current affairs in Italy.

Others
 Yoon Bok-in as Oh Gyeong-ja
Former maid accused of murdering the late CEO of Shinkwang Bank and Hong Yoo-chan's client. It is later revealed that she is Vincenzo Cassano's birth mother. She is killed, orchestrated by Choi Myung-hee under Jang Han-seok's order.
 Jung Wook-jin as Lee Seon-ho
One of the test subjects for the drug RDU-90. He is the whistleblower for Babel Pharmaceuticals.
 Lee Do-guk as Hwang Gyu
Choi Myung-hee's former enforcer and later Vincenzo's enforcer. He arranged Hong Yoo-chan's murder. He used to work for the Korean Military's Intelligence Division. He is later killed by Vincenzo after exceeding his usefulness.
 Kim Tae-hoon as Pyo Hyuk-pil
Choi Myung-hee's former enforcer and currently Vincenzo's enforcer. He works under Hwang Gyu. He also used to work for the Korean Military's Intelligence Division. He is later killed by Choi Myung-hee after Vincenzo abandoned him.

Special appearances
 Jin Seon-kyu as an unnamed robber #1( 1)
 Acting as a limousine taxi driver.
 Lee Hee-joon as an unnamed robber #2 (Ep. 1)
 Jung Soon-won as an airport police (Ep. 1)
 Yoo Jae-myung as Hong Yoo-chan (Ep. 1 -3)
A lawyer who was the CEO of the Jipuragi Law Firm and Chairman of the Development Opposition Committee for Geumga Plaza. He is the father of Hong Cha-young. He believes that justice is above all else and would never compromise his principles, and he was a mentor-like figure to Vincenzo. He is later killed under Choi Myung-hee's orders, inspiring his daughter Hong Cha-young to take revenge against Babel. 
 Kim Jin-yi as past client (Ep. 4–5)
 Shin Seung-hwan as So Hyun-woo (Ep. 5)
 A corrupt attorney on Wusang Law Firm's payroll.
 Jeong Yeong-ju as a lady driving out of the court (Ep. 5)
 Cha Soon-bae as Judge Heo (Ep. 6)
 Ahn Chang-hwan as Gilbeot (Gilbert)
 A homeless man staying outside Geumga Plaza; everyone thinks his name is Gilbert, but he corrects them. He tells Vincenzo Gilbeot means "a friend on the road." (Ep. 6–7, 12)
 Yoo Yeon as Kim Yeo-won (Ep. 7)
 The wife of Gil Jong-moon, also the head of Sungwon University Hospital's Pediatric Cancer Center.
 Kim Byung-ji as coach of the youth football team (Ep. 7)
 Kim Sung-cheol as Hwang Min-sung (Ep. 8, 20)
 The CEO of Shinkwang Bank.
 Im Chae-moo as an employee of Moomoo Land (Ep. 8)
 Jeon Gook-hyang as Seo Young-sun (Ep. 8, 20)
 The mother of Hwang Min-sung and Chairwoman of Shinkwang Finances.
 Nichkhun and Hwang Chan-sung as leads of UCN drama "The Age of Stray Dogs and Wild Dogs" (Ep. 12)
 Yoon Kyung-ho as Nam Shin-bae (Ep. 13)
 The chairman of the Babel Guardian Committee Union.
 Jeon Jin-oh as Park Chan-gi (Ep. 13)
 Lee Hye-jung as Jung Do-hee (Ep. 14–15)
 The director of Ragusang Gallery.
 Keum Gwang-san as Keum Gwang-jin (Ep. 14)
 Jeon Jin-gi as Oh Jung-bae (Ep. 15)
 The CEO of Daechang Daily.
 Lee Geung-young as Park Seung-joon (Ep. 17)
 A presidential candidate.
 Yoo Tae-woong as Kim Seok-woo (Ep. 17–20)
 The secretary of Park Seung-joon, and a senior of Han Seung-hyuk.

Episodes

Production
In May 2020, director Kim Hee-won and screenwriter Park Jae-bum teamed up for Vincenzo. In July 2020, it was reported that Song Joong-ki and Jeon Yeo-been are considering the offer to star in the series; while Ok Taec-yeon was confirmed for the cast. Song and Jeon confirmed their appearance in the following month.

The first script reading took place on January 5, 2021.

The drama serves as a reunion project for Kwak Dong-yeon and Kim Yeo-jin who both starred in the 2018 drama My Strange Hero. This drama also reunites Ok Taec-yeon and Jeon Yeo-been who worked together in Save Me (2017).

The series was planned to be partially shot in Italy but due to the COVID-19 pandemic, related scenes were augmented with CGI.

Episodes 17 and 18 were delayed one week due to the production team wanting to "improve quality" of the episodes.

Original soundtrack

Vincenzo (Original Television Soundtrack) 
Tracklist

Singles 

Part 1

Part 2

Part 3

Part 4

Part 5

Part 6

Reception

Viewership

A 7.7% average viewership rating was recorded nationwide for the series' first episode, at the time making it the third-highest premiere rating of any weekend drama of the network and fourth-highest premiere rating overall, bested by Mr. Sunshine, Encounter and Mr. Queen.

The drama is currently the tenth highest-rated drama in Korean cable television history.

Awards and nominations

Listicle

Notes

References

External links
  
 
 
 

2020s black comedy television series
2021 South Korean television series debuts
TVN (South Korean TV channel) television dramas
Television series by Studio Dragon
Television series by Logos Film
South Korean legal television series
South Korean black comedy television series
South Korean comedy-drama television series
South Korean crime television series
Television series about organized crime
Korean-language Netflix exclusive international distribution programming
Cultural depictions of the Mafia
2021 South Korean television series endings
Television series about prosecutors